Antonio Esposito (born 9 September 1983) is an Italian footballer who plays for Sorrento. He spent entire career in Italian Lega Pro and Serie D division (3 to 5 highest level of the pyramid)

Biography
Esposito started his career at Serie D team Arbus, located in Sardinia island. He then returned to the Province of Naples and played for Comprensorio Stabia (Juve Stabia). He followed the latter to promote from Serie D to Serie C2 and from Serie C2 to Serie C1 in 2005.

In 2007, he signed a 3-year contract with Foggia. He left for Paganese in the next season. In July 2009, he was signed by Sorrento in co-ownership deal.

References

External links
 Sorrento Profile 
 Football.it Profile 

Italian footballers
S.S. Juve Stabia players
Calcio Foggia 1920 players
Paganese Calcio 1926 players
A.S.D. Sorrento players
Association football midfielders
Footballers from Naples
1983 births
Living people